Acomoptera is a genus of flies belonging to the family Mycetophilidae.

The species of this genus are found in Europe and Northern America.

Species:
 Acomoptera crispa Kerr, 2011 
 Acomoptera digitata Kerr, 2011

References

Mycetophilidae
Sciaroidea genera